Jaime Solares is a Bolivian labor leader, and a major figure in the Bolivian Workers' Center (in Spanish, Central Obrera Boliviana or COB), Bolivia's largest union confederation.

Further reading

Bolivian trade union leaders
Year of birth missing (living people)
Living people